The typing game is a genre of video games that involves typing. Early typing games were a subgenre of educational games and used to familiarize players with keyboard use, but they later progressed to become their own category of games as players became more acclimated to the use of a keyboard and the games became more difficult and complex. Usually, a typing game will require the player to quickly or precisely type in words - or individual letters, numbers, or other keys - that display on the screen to proceed in the game, functioning as both a challenge and a means to improve one's skill at touch typing. 
Some online typing games offer a competitive way of testing a player's typing speed and making it [typing] more addictive. 

While most early players encountered the genre via minigames, such as car racing, within the software Mavis Beacon Teaches Typing, the genre branched out to entire games based on typing, both parodic and serious in nature. Due to the limited commercial viability of such games in the AAA market, they are typically created by indie developers, and largely released for PC due to the lack of keyboards on most video game consoles.

History 

In 2000, The Typing of the Dead became known as the "ultimate typing game parody", adapting The House of the Dead 2 to replace the gun with a computer keyboard so that the player must type to defeat zombies.

A resurgence in typing games among indie titles saw the releases of parodies of typing tutor games, including David Lynch Teaches Typing, Cooldog Teaches Typing, and Icarus Proudbottom Teaches Typing. Non-parodic games were also developed, such as Keyboard Sports, The Textorcist, Epistory - Typing Chronicles, and Nanotale - Typing Chronicles, which largely dropped the educational context of the genre and featured similar gameplay and storytelling as a traditional video game. The video game series Cook, Serve, Delicious! was noted as being an "accidental" typing game, as despite the fact that it was a fan remake of an initially controller-based series, the move to PC necessitated the addition of keyboard  controls.

As typing games branched out and crossed over into other genres, their developers faced challenges advertising the games, due to the fact that most people still assume them to be edutainment. Diego Sacchetti, designer of The Textorcist, stated that when the game released in 2019, 90% of the coverage from critics compared the game to Mavis Beacon, causing him frustration, as he would classify it as a "type 'em up".

In the modern day, the familiarity of most players with keyboards has allowed typing games to have a "moment", causing players to think of the device in "new, more interesting ways". Compared to the past, the need to learn typing is less prevalent, since most people do it from an early age, enabling developers of typing games to pursue non-educational gameplay.

See also 

 Educational game
Typequick
Kewala's Typing Adventure

References 

Video game genres